Matveyevo is a rural locality (a selo) in Matveyevsky Selsoviet, Kushnarenkovsky District, Bashkortostan, Russia. The population was 106 as of 2010. There are 3 streets.

Geography 
Matveyevo is located 10 km northwest of Kushnarenkovo (the district's administrative centre) by road. Yakupovo is the nearest rural locality.

References 

Rural localities in Kushnarenkovsky District